Clayton Landey is an American actor who has appeared in films and television shows. He played James Westmont in the TV series Knots Landing from 1982-1983. He has been a professional performer, mime, actor, director, producer, writer and teacher for over 45 years. Most recently he guest starred in the initial season of Tales and starred in the film Down 4 Whatever for TV One.

He starred as Roger Barrow in the first season of 1st & Ten, the first scripted half hour comedy original series on HBO. He has had recurring roles in ten other TV series including 3 seasons as attorney James Westmont on Knots Landing and 1 year as the evil Gregory on Days of Our Lives. Other shows with multiple episodes include: Dynasty, Walker, Texas Ranger, Without a Trace, and Stargate: Atlantis. Most recently he recurred for two seasons on If Loving You Is Wrong. He starred in the pilot Used Cars for CBS and guest starred in the pilot SNOOPS. He appeared in the Sliders episode (5/14) "Heavy Metal" (1999). His work has been represented at the Cannes (She’s So Lovely), Sundance (Shadow Hours) and Venice (The Reluctant Fundamentalist) Film Festivals. Norma Rae, Clayton’s first feature, was named in 2011 to The Library of Congress National Film Registry.

He has appeared in over forty theatrical productions in New York, Los Angeles, Atlanta and Dallas. He received a Drama-Logue Award, an LA Weekly Award, a Maddy, a Garland Award and a Los Angeles Drama Critics Circle nomination for his performance as Luther Adler in the critically acclaimed production of Names at the Matrix Theater in Los Angeles. He recreated the role the following season in the Off-Broadway production. He also received a Drama-Logue for producing the multi-award winning Andrea’s Got Two Boyfriends.

His training includes a BA in Drama from the University of Houston a year with Darryl Hickman and Masters classes with Stella Adler and Marlon Brando.

He teaches Scene Study For The Working Actor and Get Out of Your Head at the Alliance Theatre.

Filmography

References

External links
 

American male film actors
American male soap opera actors
American male television actors
Jewish American male actors
Living people
Male actors from New York City
People from the Bronx
20th-century American male actors
21st-century American male actors
1951 births
21st-century American Jews